Orbitor is a bus rapid transit station on the Mississauga Transitway in Mississauga, Ontario, Canada. It is located along the north side of Eglinton Avenue at Orbitor Drive.

Spectrum and Orbitor opened on 1 May 2017.

References

External links

flickr search for: Mississauga Transitway Orbitor

Mississauga Transitway
2017 establishments in Ontario